This is a list of songs which received the most airplay per week on radio stations in the United States as ranked and published by Billboard magazine on the Hot 100 Airplay chart during the 2000s.

Number-one airplay hits

Statistics

Artists by total number-one singles

Artists by total cumulative weeks at number one

Songs by total number of weeks at number one

See also
 2000s in music
 List of Hot 100 number-one singles of the 2000s (U.S.)

References

United States Hot 100 Airplay
Billboard charts
Lists of number-one songs in the United States
2000s in American music